A gumdrop is a type of confectionery (candy).

Gumdrop or gum drop may also refer to:
 Gumdrop (book series), a series of children's books written and illustrated by Val Biro concerning an antique car called "Gumdrop"
 "Gum Drop" (song), a popular song written by Rudy Toombs, recorded by the Crew Cuts in 1955
 Gumdrop Seamount, a small seamount off the coast of Central California
 "Gum Drops", an episode of the sixth season of CSI: Crime Scene Investigation
 the command/service module (CSM) of the Apollo 9 mission